The following tables show results for the Australian House of Representatives at the 1984 federal election held on 1 December 1984.

Australia

States

New South Wales

Victoria

Queensland

Western Australia

South Australia

Tasmania

Territories

Australian Capital Territory

Northern Territory

See also
 Results of the 1984 Australian federal election (Senate)
 Members of the Australian House of Representatives, 1984–1987

References

House of Representatives 1984
Australian House of Representatives
1984 elections in Australia